Leonid Mukharbiyevich Kudayev (born 29 April 1971) is a former Russian professional football player.

External links
 

1971 births
Living people
Russian footballers
Association football defenders
PFC Spartak Nalchik players
Russian Premier League players
Russian expatriate footballers
Expatriate footballers in Ukraine